George Edgar Abecassis  (21 March 1913 – 18 December 1991) was a British racing driver, and co-founder of the HWM Formula One team.

Pre-1946 career
Born in Oatlands, Surrey, Abecassis was educated at Clifton College. He began circuit racing in 1935 in a modified Austin Seven which became known as The Einsitzer. After taking 1937 as a year away from the track, he acquired an Alta and made a name for himself in English national racing during the 1938 and 1939 seasons. In 1939, he won the Imperial Trophy Formula Libre race at Crystal Palace, driving his Alta, defeating Prince Bira, in the E.R.A. known as Romulus, in a wet race, "that being the only time it was beaten by a  car in the British Isles."

At one point, Abecassis held the Campbell circuit lap record at Brooklands at  On 3 July 1938 Abecassis broke the Prescott Hill Climb record with a climb of 47.85 seconds in his supercharged 1½-litre Alta.

When World War II broke out he joined the Royal Air Force, as a member of the Volunteer Reserves, and became an experienced pilot, ultimately becoming a member of the secret "Moon Squadrons", ferrying secret agents in and out of occupied countries in Europe with specially-modified Halifax and Stirling aircraft. During the course of his wartime service Abecassis was awarded the Distinguished Flying Cross and was mentioned in dispatches with the following citation:

Abecassis achieved the rank of squadron leader, and, following the war, continued as a member of the RAF Volunteer Reserves prior to his discharge in 1953.

Post-1946 career

After World War II Abecassis went back to racing, initially with pre-war machinery. He won a race at Gransden Lodge in a road-going 3.3-litre Bugatti on 15 June 1946. In 1947, Abecassis finished second in the Swedish Grand Prix, held on a frozen lake at Vallentuna, driving an E.R.A.  In 1948, he finished second to Bob Gerard in the Jersey International Road Race. He became a partner, with John Heath, in Hersham and Walton Motors Ltd., a motor dealership and garage in Walton-on-Thames. Building on his pre-war association with the Alta marque, Abecassis and HWM assisted in the development of the Alta GP car, designed to comply with the recently introduced Formula One regulations.

After the failure of this enterprise, Abecassis and Heath decided to construct their own cars under the HWM banner, but retaining Alta engines. Initially the HWM cars were designed to compete in the Formula Two class, but when the World Championship switched to Formula Two regulations in  HWM cars became eligible to compete in the Grand Prix events. During their prime, HWM employed such future stars as Stirling Moss and Peter Collins, and the Belgian Johnny Claes scored their first victory, in the Grand Prix des Frontières at a street circuit in Chimay, Belgium. Abecassis's HWM team also took a notable victory in the International Trophy race at Silverstone in 1952, this time with Lance Macklin at the wheel.

It was with his own HWM cars that Abecassis raced in his only two Formula One World Championship Grands Prix, at the Bremgarten circuit, in the 1951 and 1952 Swiss Grand Prix. He also finished second in the 12 Hours of Sebring in 1953, partnered by Reg Parnell. In 1953, Abecassis constructed an HWM sports car for his own personal use, powered by a Jaguar straight-6 engine, with which he successfully contested many national British races until 1956.

In 1956, Heath was killed in an accident in the Mille Miglia and Abecassis retired from racing, turning his attention to running the HWM operations. He was the Facel Vega importer for Britain, while his motor industry connections were aided by the fact that he was married to Angela, the daughter of Aston Martin chairman Sir David Brown. He died aged 78, in Ibstone, near High Wycombe, Buckinghamshire.

In September 2010 his son David Abecassis published a comprehensive biography of his father under the title A Passion for Speed.

His grandson, Jonathan Abecassis, has an active interest in vintage sports car racing. He competes in the Fifties Sports Car Racing Club ("FISCAR") series, driving an Austin Healey 100/4.

Racing record

Career highlights

Complete Formula One World Championship results
(key)

Complete 24 Hours of Le Mans results

Complete 12 Hours of Sebring results

Complete Mille Miglia results

Complete 24 Hours of Spa results

Complete 12 Hours of Reims results

Complete 12 Hours of Hyères results

References

Further reading

External links
 George Abecassis Racing Driver with a Passion for Speed (georgeabecassis.com), 2010.
 Our History, HWM of Walton on Thames, West London.
 Fast motoring in a Facel Vega,, Motor Sport Magazine, August 1958.
 

1913 births
1991 deaths
English Formula One drivers
Hersham and Walton Motors Formula One drivers
English racing drivers
Grand Prix drivers
Recipients of the Distinguished Flying Cross (United Kingdom)
24 Hours of Le Mans drivers
24 Hours of Spa drivers
12 Hours of Sebring drivers
Mille Miglia drivers
World Sportscar Championship drivers
English aviators
Royal Air Force squadron leaders
People educated at Clifton College
Royal Air Force Volunteer Reserve personnel of World War II
Sportspeople from Chertsey
Brighton Speed Trials people
Royal Air Force pilots of World War II
Formula One team owners
Formula One team principals
Military personnel from Surrey
British World War II bomber pilots